Kyle Berkshire (born November 1, 1996) is an American golfer who competes as a professional long drive athlete. He has won the World Long Drive Championship on two occasions, in 2019 and 2021.

Personal life
Originally from Crofton, Maryland, Berkshire resides in Orlando, Florida. He attended Archbishop Spalding High School in Maryland where he helped the Spalding golf team win two match play and two stroke play MIAA state championships. The team went 31-2-1 in match play during Berkshire's four years including undefeated seasons in 2014 and 2015. He went to the University of North Texas for two years, before transferring to the University of Central Florida.

Long drive career
After reaching the semifinals at the Volvik World Long Drive Championship in 2017, Berkshire in 2018 earned his first World Long Drive victory, winning at the WinStar Midwest Slam in Oklahoma. On September 4, 2019 Berkshire won the 44th World Long Drive Championship in Thackerville, Oklahoma, defeating Tim Burke in the final. 

During the pandemic, Comcast shut down the World Long Drive Association in 2020.  Players and coach Bobby Peterson formed a new sanctioning body, the Professional Long Drivers Association, where Berkshire won the inaugural PLDA season-ending championship in 2020 at 383 yards. PLDA 2020 Final   He defended the PLDA Championship (now the PLDA World Championship) in 2021, now having won three consecutive season-ending long drive tour championships.

References

American male golfers
American long drive golfers
1996 births
Living people
People from Crofton, Maryland
Sportspeople from Anne Arundel County, Maryland
Golfers from Maryland
North Texas Mean Green men's golfers